Anselm may refer to:

People

Saints
 Anselm, Duke of Friuli (s), Benedictine monk and abbot Nonantula
 Anselm of Canterbury (  1033–1109), philosopher, Abbot of Bec, and Archbishop of Canterbury
 Anselm of Lucca (1036–1086), better known as Saint Anselm of Lucca

Bishops
 Anselm I (bishop of Milan) ( 813–818), bishop of Milan
 Anselm II (archbishop of Milan) (died 896), also known as Anselm II Capra
 Anselm I of Aosta (994–1026), the last bishop to serve as count of Aosta, and brother-in-law of Burchard, bishop of Aosta
 Anselm I of Lucca (died 1073), better known as Pope Alexander II
 Anselm II (1070s  1090s), bishop of Aosta
 Anselm III (archbishop of Milan) ( 1086–1093)
 Anselm IV (archbishop of Milan) ( 1097–1101)
 Anselm of Havelberg (–1158), Premonstratensian canon and archbishop of Ravenna
 Anselm V (Archbishop of Milan) ( 1126–1136), also known as Anselmo della Pusterla
 Anselm of Meissen (13th century), bishop of Warmia
 Anselmo Guido Pecorari (born 1946), Roman Catholic cardinal

Clerics
 Anselm of Farfa (died 883), also known as Zelmo
 Anselm of Besate, 11th-century churchman and rhetorician
 Anselm Grün (born 1945), German Benedictine monk and religious writer
 Anselm of Liège (1008–1056), chronicler of the Prince-Bishopric of Liège
 Anselm of Laon (died 1117), French biblical scholar, properly known as Ansel
 Anselm of Gembloux (died 1136), abbot of Gembloux Abbey in Namur, Belgium
 Anselm of St Saba and of Bury (died 1148), Benedictine monk elected bishop of London but refused consecration by Innocent II

Other people
 Anselm of Capraia, 13th-century Pisan count
 Anselm Feuerbach (1829–1880), German painter
 Anselm Kiefer (born 1945), German painter and sculptor
 Anslem de Silva (born 1940), Sri Lankan Sinhala biologist and herpetologist

Other uses
 Saint Anselm College, a liberal arts college in the US
 List of ships named Anselm

See also
 Ansel (disambiguation) and Ansell (disambiguation), the German form of the name
 Anselmo (disambiguation), the Italian form of the name
 Anselmus (disambiguation), the Latin form of the name
 Saint Anselm's (disambiguation), various places